Pommer is a German surname meaning Pomeranian. Notable people with the surname include:

Albert Pommer (1886–1946), German film producer
Erich Pommer (1889–1966), German-born film producer and executive
Jānis Pommers, first Latvian Archbishop of the Latvian Orthodox Church
Markus Pommer (born 1991), German racing driver
Reinhold Pommer (1935–2014), road and track cyclist from Germany
William Albert Pommer (1895–1971), Liberal party member of the Canadian House of Commons
William Henry Pommer (1851–1937), American composer

See also
Pommer, an early musical reed instrument

German-language surnames
Toponymic surnames
Ethnonymic surnames